The Journal of Industrial Textiles is a peer-reviewed scientific journal that covers materials science as applied to textiles. Its editor-in-chief is Dong Zhang . It was established in 1971 and is published by SAGE Publications.

Abstracting and indexing 
The journal is abstracted and indexed in Scopus and the Science Citation Index Expanded. According to the Journal Citation Reports, its 2020 impact factor is 3.732, ranking it 4th out of 25 journals in the category "Materials  Science, Textiles".

References

External links 
 

SAGE Publishing academic journals
English-language journals
Publications established in 1971
Materials science journals
Quarterly journals